"Too Many Broken Hearts" is a song by Australian singer and actor Jason Donovan, released on 20 February 1989 as the third single from his debut album, Ten Good Reasons (1989), and 1991's Greatest Hits album and again on a later collection in 2006. The song reached number-one in the United Kingdom and Ireland in March 1989. The song additionally peaked within the top 10 in Australia, Denmark, France, the Netherlands, Norway and Spain. British magazine Classic Pop ranked "Too Many Broken Hearts"  number 19 in their list of "Top 40 Stock Aitken Waterman songs" in 2021.

Background
Written and produced by Stock Aitken Waterman (SAW), the song attracted some media controversy after producer Pete Waterman outrageously claimed he "wrote the song on the toilet in ten minutes". The claim has been dismissed by the song's actual composer, Mike Stock, who says Waterman only supplied a rough title idea for the song. 

Donovan said he recorded sections of the song on different days, describing the process as "pop singing by numbers". He initially had no idea the track would go on to be so successful, and thought it might just be an album track. However, he now regards it as one of SAW's best songs, as well as being his defining hit.

Critical reception
Richard Lowe from  Smash Hits wrote, "This is something of a landmark in the history of pop. Blow me down if it isn't the first ever single written and produced by Stock, Aitken & Waterman, to open up not with the familiar boom boom dommph fli-di-di-dum-dum roll but with what can only be described as a "guitar lick". It soon falls into familiar territory though. It's a great pop tune, Jason sings it perfectly adequately and it's bound to be a really big hit."

Music video
The accompanying music video for "Too Many Broken Hearts" was filmed in Beechworth, Victoria, and featured Donovan strumming an unpowered electric guitar in the outdoors, while interacting with an apparent love interest. The guitar scenes generated some media scorn—including a parody on TV show Hey Hey It's Saturday—and were also slammed by singer Boy George, who accused Donovan of trying to look like a rock star. 

The singer's romantic interest in the video was a local woman known to the director, Chris Langman, who had never acted or modelled before. He insists she was not cast due to her widely perceived resemblance to Kylie Minogue. The mountain shack featured in the video belonged to Langman at the time, and he chose both the shooting location and the actress out of convenience.  The video proved popular with fans, with Waterman saying its emotionally uplifting scenes and sunny landscapes represented "hope" to young people in Britain.

Track listings

 7-inch and cassette single
 "Too Many Broken Hearts" – 3:26
 "Wrap My Arms Around You" – 3:40

 12-inch single
A1. "Too Many Broken Hearts" (extended version)
B1. "Wrap My Arms Around You"
B2. "Too Many Broken Hearts" (instrumental)

 12-inch remix single
A1. "Too Many Broken Hearts" (techno mix)
B1. "Too Many Broken Hearts" (extended version)
B2. "Wrap My Arms Around You"

 CD single
 "Too Many Broken Hearts" (extended version)
 "Wrap My Arms Around You"
 "Nothing Can Divide Us"

 US 12-inch single
A1. "Too Many Broken Hearts" (urban mix) – 8:00
A2. "Too Many Broken Hearts" (techno mix) – 5:10
A3. "Too Many Broken Hearts" (edit) – 3:26
B1. "Too Many Broken Hearts" (Party Hardy mix) – 6:25
B2. "Too Many Broken Hearts" (extended mix) – 5:45

Credits and personnel
Credits are lifted from the UK CD single liner notes.

Studio
 Recorded at PWL Studios 1 and 4 (London, England)

Personnel

 Stock Aitken Waterman – writing, production, arrangement
 Mike Stock – backing vocals, keyboards
 Matt Aitken – guitars, keyboards
 Mae McKenna – backing vocals
 Miriam Stockley – backing vocals
 George De Angelis – additional keyboards
 A. Linn – drums
 Mixmaster Pete Hammond – mixing
 Karen Hewitt – engineering
 Yoyo – engineering
 David Howells – design
 Lawrence Lawry – photography

Charts

Weekly charts

Year-end charts

Certifications

References

1988 songs
1989 songs
1989 singles
Jason Donovan songs
Irish Singles Chart number-one singles
Mushroom Records singles
Pete Waterman Entertainment singles
Song recordings produced by Stock Aitken Waterman
Songs written by Mike Stock (musician)
Songs written by Matt Aitken
Songs written by Pete Waterman
UK Singles Chart number-one singles